Railinc Corporation (pronounced "rail-link") provides rail data and messaging services to the North American freight railway industry. Railinc is a for-profit subsidiary of the Association of American Railroads.

Corporate structure
Railinc was established as an information technology department within the Association of American Railroads (AAR), and later spun off as a wholly owned, for-profit subsidiary of the AAR in 1998. The nine-member corporate board of directors consists entirely of members of the railroad industry, including all of the Class I railroads in North America and the AAR.

Railinc headquarters is located in Cary, North Carolina. Railinc's headquarters was relocated from joint operations in Chicago, Illinois and Washington, D.C., in 1999. Locations also considered were Denver, Colorado, Tampa, Florida, and Austin, Texas.  

Railinc employs nearly 300 full-time and contractor employees, approximately ten percent of whom are certified project managers.

Products and services
Railinc processes and delivers rail data as a service (DaaS) and provides software as a service (SaaS) to the freight rail industry. Because many of the company's IT systems are required by formal railroad operating rules, the company’s applications and services can be found embedded in critical operations and financial systems throughout the industry.  

Key Railinc services include:
 Umler - The Umler system is the rail industry's official source for rail equipment information, including freight cars of all varieties, locomotives and end of train devices.   This system replaced the legacy U.M.L.E.R. database, an acronym for Universal Machine Language Equipment Register. The name was changed in 2009 with the launch of the new Umler system in favor of the lower case spelling and trademarked name. 
 RailSight - Railsight provides tracking and tracing data, known as car location messages (CLMs). The messages provide car locations to rail equipment owners, shippers, and third-party logistics providers. The data is used for fleet management and to track and trace the movement of freight and freight cars throughout North America to ensure goods are delivered on-time or to track the progress of their movement. The RailSight engine delivers more than 7.5 million rail events each day from more than 530 Class I, Class II and Class III railroads and shops across the United States, Canada and Mexico.
 Damaged and Defective Car Tracking - The Damaged and Defective Car Tracking (DDCT) system is used to identify and track damaged and defective rail cars to ensure their proper handling on the railways. This system, launched in 2011, replaced paper defect cards. Paper defect cards were used to aid in maintaining a record of the identified defects on each car, where the defects originated, and to determine the responsibility for each defect.
 Equipment Health Management System - The Equipment Health Management System (EHMS) monitors equipment to identify possible mechanical problems in cars and various car components.
 Interline Settlement System - Interline Settlement System (ISS) settles funds monthly between railroads to share revenue generated for car movement when two or more railroads are involved in the shipment route.
 Forward & Store - Forward & Store is a system to exchange interline waybill information.
 Railinc Message Service - Railinc Message Service (RMS) delivers messages over its electronic data interchange (EDI) network, including transportation waybills, advance train consists, trip plans and blocking requests and responses.
 Industry Reference Files - Railinc also maintains the North American railroad industry's official code tables, also known as industry reference files (IRFs), which includes the active reporting marks for the rail industry.  Those codes define car marks, commodities, locations and other rail information used in all intra- and inter-industry communication to assure railroad data is consistent between railroads.
 Steelroads - The company also operates Steelroads, a legacy application which allows shippers to trace the movement of their rail freight shipments.

Corporate memberships
The company is part of the Surface Transportation Board information sharing and analysis center (ST-ISAC).

References

External links

Railinc LinkedIn Profile
Railinc 2019 Annual Report
Railinc 2018 Annual Report
Railinc 2017 Annual Report
Railinc 2016 Annual Report
Railinc 2015 Annual Report
Railinc 2014 Annual Report
Railinc 2013 Annual Report
Railinc 2012 Annual Report
Railinc 2011 Annual Report
Association of American Railroads

Software companies based in North Carolina
Companies based in Cary, North Carolina
Privately held companies based in North Carolina
Software companies established in 1999
Software companies of the United States
1999 establishments in North Carolina